Dark Hollow Run is a tributary of the Delaware River contained wholly within Solebury Township, Bucks County, Pennsylvania, meeting with the Delaware south of New Hope.

History
A branch line of the Postal Telegraph Company was connected with the main line from Trenton, NJ, in the summer of 1888.

Statistics
The Geographic Name Information System I.D. is 1172941,

U.S. Department of the Interior Geological Survey I.D. is 03034.

Course

Municipalities
Bucks County
Solebury Township

Crossings and Bridges
South Sugan Road
Aquetong Road

References

Rivers of Bucks County, Pennsylvania
Rivers of Pennsylvania